= Geierwand =

Mountain in Italy

- Location within Italy

Highest point
- Elevation: 2,088 m (6,850 ft)
- Coordinates: 46°37′43″N 12°12′57″E

Geography
- Location: South Tyrol, Italy
- Parent range: Dolomites

The Geierwand (Italian: Parete dell' Avvoltoio; German: Geierwand) is a mountain in the Dolomites in South Tyrol, Italy. The Geierwand crag provides a view onto lake Dürrensee and the Höhlensteintal. The yellow Dolomite limestone hosts athletic climbing routes up to 35 m high from 4a to 8c, and climbing is possible almost all year round, even in bad weather as the crag remains dry after extended periods of rain. Popular route during the Dolorock Climbing Festival.
